Brigadier James Michael Calvert,  (6 March 1913 – 26 November 1998) was a British Army officer who was involved in special operations in Burma during the Second World War. He participated in both Chindit operations and was instrumental in popularizing the unorthodox ideas of Orde Wingate. He frequently led attacks from the front, a practice that earned him the nickname amongst the men under his command of "Mad Mike."

Early life
Calvert was born at Rohtak in India, son of a member of the Indian Civil Service. He was educated at Bradfield College and the Royal Military Academy, Woolwich, from which was commissioned as a subaltern into the British Army's Royal Engineers as a professional soldier.

Military career
Calvert was commissioned into the Royal Engineers in 1933, and for a time was the Army's middleweight boxing champion. He spent a year reading for the Mechanical Engineering Tripos at St. John's College, Cambridge. In 1934 he returned to active service and was posted to the Hong Kong Royal Engineers, where he learned to speak Cantonese. He also witnessed the Imperial Japanese Army's attack on Shanghai and the rape of Nanking, which made him one of the few officers in the British Army before the Second World War who fully appreciated the nature of the threat posed by Japanese imperialism.

When the Second World War broke out in 1939, Calvert briefly commanded a detachment of Royal Engineers in the Norwegian campaign, then trained commando detachments in demolition techniques in Hong Kong and Australia. In Australia, along with F. Spencer Chapman, he assisted with training Australian commandos who formed the first Australian Army Independent Companies at Wilsons Promontory, Victoria in 1941. He was then appointed to command the Bush Warfare School in Burma, training officers and non-commissioned officers to lead guerilla bands in China for operations against the Japanese.

The Japanese invaded Burma in early 1942. Calvert and others from the school raided Henzada by riverboat after the fall of Rangoon as a deception operation to convince the Japanese that Australian reinforcements had reached Burma. Calvert then spent a period of time touring Burma with Orde Wingate. After the Bush Warfare School closed, Calvert was sent with 22 men from the school and a few hundred men separated from their units to guard the Gokteik Viaduct thirty miles east of Maymyo. (The Allied Commander in Chief, General Archibald Wavell apparently hoped that Calvert would use his initiative and demolish it, in spite of orders from the civil government to keep it intact. For once, Calvert obeyed orders.)

After retreating from the viaduct, Calvert participated in a deception operation involving the loss of a set of false papers to the Japanese. Calvert's unit finally retreated to India at the very rear of the army, often behind the Japanese lines.

Operation Longcloth
In India, Calvert reunited with the equally unorthodox Wingate, and the two became firm friends. Calvert led one of the company-sized columns in Operation Longcloth, Wingate's first Chindit operation in 1943. This was a long-range penetration operation behind enemy lines, which put great demands on the endurance of all who took part. Calvert was awarded the Distinguished Service Order (DSO) for his achievements on the operation. His column achieved the greatest amount of demolition of the Japanese lines of communication, and reached India intact with the fewest casualties of those in the force.

Operation Thursday

The Fly-In
Calvert commanded the 77th Indian Infantry Brigade in Operation Thursday, the much larger second Chindit operation. His brigade spearheaded the airborne landings deep in the Japanese rear. The operation was staged from Lalaghat, with D-Day fixed for 5 March. That morning, one of General Philip Cochran's B-25 Mitchells flew over and photographed the landing zones. Wingate had ordered that no aircraft should fly over the landing zones, lest the operation be betrayed, but Cochran was not directly under Wingate's command and felt that launching the operation without accurate intelligence was a dangerous gamble. The photographs clearly showed that one of landing sites selected, codenamed Piccadilly, was unusable.

It was at this dramatic moment, with everyone keyed up and ready to go, that the aerial photographs arrived. They showed that primary landing site Broadway was clear, but Piccadilly had been blocked by tree trunks; no gliders would land there that night. The general opinion was that the Japs had realized the possibilities of Piccadilly as a landing area and had deliberately blocked it, though some time later we discovered that the explanation was much simpler: Burmese woodmen had laid out their trees to dry in the clearing.

Wingate was enraged by Cochran's actions but admitted that the danger was real. He and Calvert weighed the options. The danger of executing a potentially compromised operation were substantial, but any delay threatened to push back the window of opportunity by at least a month. Of the three planned sites only two were available; Calvert suggested the plan be further altered and the entire brigade flown into Broadway. He said, "I am prepared to take the whole of my brigade into Broadway and do without [second landing site] Piccadilly." Calvert later wrote, "We had taken into account that [third landing site] Chowringhee was to the east of the Irrawaddy while Broadway was west of the river. I told Wingate, 'I don't want to split my brigade either side of the Irrawaddy. I am prepared to take all the brigade into Broadway alone and take the consequence of a slower build-up.'" Lieutenant-General William Slim "asked Calvert…and found him strongly against [using] Chowringhee." Further discussion with Slim and Wingate clinched the matter: "it was to be Broadway alone. I was nervous as bales, I imagine we all were, but we all knew we had to go…In any case Broadway was clear and I could really see no reason why we should not go in there just because Piccadilly was blocked."

Each American C-47 towed two heavily laden Waco CG-4 gliders. Although a double tow posed no problems for a competent pilot in good weather, many of the pilots were inexperienced and the route across the mountain ranges bordering the Chindwin river guaranteed a turbulent, unsettled flight. The first gliders were scheduled to arrive at Broadway by 9:30pm, but by 2:00am Wingate and the others waiting at Lalaghat had not yet heard from Calvert. Poor reconnaissance, not enemy resistance, caused the delay, as aerial reconnaissance had failed to show a number of ditches scarring the field at Broadway. Calvert wrote:

All six of the advance party gliders had landed and the plan had been that we would wheel them off to make way for the next batch, which would in turn be wheeled away and so on. But we had reckoned without the ditches. Three of the six gliders were so badly wrecked that the small force at present on the ground could not shift them. We worked at them furiously but suddenly I heard a shout and looked up. In the bright light of the moon I saw to my horror that the first two of the next batch had cast off [their tows] and were winging their silent way down.

Calvert transmitted the prearranged signal "Soya Link", the most despised of ration items, to stop all flying, but at 6:30am on 6 March he radioed the code words "Pork Sausage" to resume flights into Broadway. A strip for C-47s was in place that evening, and supplies came rushing in. Calvert lost no time in organizing reconnaissance missions and fortifying Broadway. By 13 March the build-up was complete. In seven nights about 9,000 men, 1,350 animals, 250 tons of supplies and weapons had landed behind enemy lines in Burma.

Broadway
On 17 March Calvert led a bayonet charge against Japanese positions shielded by a sunken road and a steep hill crowned with a pagoda. He noticed that friendly forces nearby were drawing heavier fire. In fact, elements of the South Staffordshire Regiment had dug in adjacent to a Japanese unit. Neither force was aware of the other. Deciding that something had to be done, he elected to make a frontal assault:

I saw something had to be done pretty quickly, so I shouted to Freddie that we were going to charge. I then told everyone that we were going to charge the Pagoda Hill. There were reinforcements on our left flank who would charge as well. So, standing up, I shouted out 'Charge' in the approved Victorian manner, and ran down the hill…Half of the South Staffords joined in. Then looking back I found a lot had not. So I told them to bloody well 'Charge, what the hell do you think you're doing.' So they charged. Machine-gunners, mortar teams, all officers – everybody who was on that hill

The fighting quickly degenerated into a free-for-all. Calvert characterized the action as an "extraordinary mêlée…everyone shooting, bayoneting, kicking at everyone else, rather like an officers' guest night." Lieutenant George Cairns was awarded the Victoria Cross for killing several Japanese after one severed his left arm with a sword. A pause in the fighting turned into a stalemate, complete with shouting – according to Calvert "[t]he Japs were yelling at us in English, 'You dirty hairy bastards,' etc.; only a final charge made by Calvert and some Gurkhas dislodged the Japanese. Many of these were shot as they retreated. Afterward, "the hill was a horrid sight, littered with Jap dead, and already the ones who had been killed there earlier in the day were black with flies. Stretcher-bearers were removing our wounded and our mercifully very few dead."

Shortly after this action a lieutenant in the South Staffordshire Regiment, Norman Durant, wrote a compelling description of Calvert in a letter to his parents:

His hair flops over his forehead, and he has a disconcerting habit of staring at you when you speak to him and yet not appearing to hear a word. His lectures were always painfully slow and hesitant and during training he gave the impression of taking a long time to make up his mind; in action things were very different. He knows all the officers in the brigade and many of the senior NCOs, and his manner and attitude are always the same if he is talking to a CO, a subaltern or a private…

Calvert's dedication to the troops under his command was one of his most visible attributes. According to David Rooney he was "one of the most successful of the Chindit leaders [and] showed his greatness as a commander by reminding his men that, however bad things were for them, things were probably much worse for the enemy."

White City
The brigade then captured and held a position near Mawlu. Calvert "saw that Mawlu [the location of the block] was the crucial point for road and rail traffic and determined to build up a defensive box there." Because of the supply drop parachutes adorning the surrounding jungle, it became known as the White City. This fortified position blocked Japanese road and rail communications to their northern front for over two months. A large rectangle, 1,000 by 800 yards, White City was quickly identified by the Japanese as a threat. Probing attacks on 18, 19, and 20 March inflicted a handful of casualties, but were beaten back without significant loss. The Japanese mounted a serious attack on the night of 21 March that resulted in "[v]ery confused close-quarter fighting" that lasted all night. Two Japanese light machine guns were established in the block; a dawn attack led by flamethrower-equipped infantry displaced the Japanese, driving them outside the perimeter. Calvert was instrumental in orchestrating the counterattacks and was frequently under fire.

After repulsing numerous nighttime attacks, Calvert had two relatively quiet weeks to fortify White City. Under his direction a thick hedge of barbed wire was put in place and surrounded with mines and booby traps. Firing positions were dug in and camouflaged; reinforced with logs and earth, these positions were invisible and all-but impenetrable. Calvert also established a defensive fire plan to coordinate machine gun and mortar fire. Some 2-pounder anti-tank guns arrived on 29 March and were quickly put in place. These were followed by engineers who built a landing strip capable of handling C-47 cargo aircraft, which delivered more artillery. White City was eventually defended by four anti-tank guns, six Bofors 40 mm autocannons and four 25-pounders. Calvert had a not insubstantial arsenal at his disposal.

On 6 April the White City again came under attack. The Japanese shelled and bombed the block throughout the afternoon. Calvert recalled that the terrain combined with meticulous attention to detail in constructing the positions provided shelter, and that casualties were low. The only effective weapon the Japanese possessed was a 6-inch mortar, an old coastal defence piece they had laboriously dragged through the jungle to bombard the block. The mortar fired a bomb four and a half feet long that was in flight for more than 30 seconds. Calvert described the mortar as "the bane of our existence." Calvert spent the attack in a dugout, coordinating his troops' response via telephone. He reported that stiff resistance led by his friend Ian MacPherson prevented the Japanese from breaching the block.

From 6 April through 11 April, Calvert wrote, "[t]he sequence of attack was the same practically every night and only varied in intensity." Japanese infantry attacked after dark, invariably running into stiff resistance from emplaced machine guns, mines, barbed wire, booby traps, artillery, and sustained rifle fire. The Japanese brought forward two light tanks; these were quickly destroyed with 2-pounder anti-tank guns. Confident in the block's ability to withstand any attack, Calvert's only concern was his rapidly dwindling supply of ammunition. Machine gun ammunition was being used at a frantic pace. In all, some 700,000 rounds of Vickers machine gun ammunition were dropped into White City. Calvert requested that supply drops contain less food and more ammunition.

Calvert led several counter-attacks against encircling Japanese forces in person. On 13 April he commanded a much larger attack involving most of the brigade. Despite the intervention of American P-51 Mustangs, the attack was a failure; Calvert was forced to order a retreat. He learned that Major Ian MacPherson, commander of the headquarters company of the 77th Brigade had been killed, his body left in the Japanese positions. Calvert said he "could not leave anyone like that without knowing for certain" before starting back to look for MacPherson. Only when the brigade major "heaved out his revolver, stuck it in my stomach and said, 'I'll shoot you if you don't go back. I was with him when he was killed'" did Calvert resume the retreat.

Mogaung

In May, the Chindit brigades moved north. The monsoon had broken and floods impeded the Chindits' operations. On 27 May, Major-General Walter Lentaigne (who had taken command of the Chindits after Wingate was killed in an air crash in late March) ordered Calvert's brigade to capture the town of Mogaung. Calvert at first promised to capture Mogaung by 5 June. However, the Japanese reinforced the defenders of the town until it was held by a force of four battalions from the 53rd Division. As Calvert's brigade tried to advance over flooded flat ground, they suffered severely from shortage of rations, exhaustion and disease. Finally, Calvert was reinforced by a Chinese battalion and put in an all-out assault on 24 June which captured almost all of the town. The last resistance was cleared by 27 June. Calvert's brigade had suffered 800 battle casualties in the siege, half of its strength. Of the remainder, only 300 men were left fit to fight.

The American General Joseph Stilwell, who had overall command of the Chindits, announced via the BBC that the Chinese troops of his Northern Combat Area Command had captured Mogaung. Calvert signalled to Stilwell's headquarters "Chinese reported taking Mogaung. My Brigade now taking umbrage."

When he received orders to move to Myitkyina, where another Japanese garrison was holding out, Calvert closed down his brigade's radio sets and marched to Stilwell's headquarters in Kamaing instead. A court martial was threatened, but after he and Stilwell finally met in person and Stilwell appreciated for the first time the conditions under which the Chindits had operated, the 77th Brigade was evacuated to India to recover. Calvert was awarded a Bar to the DSO for the second Chindit expedition. In the field Calvert was "clearly the most successful and aggressive Chindit commander," and a font of "positive leadership" throughout the campaign.

SAS Operations

Calvert was evacuated to Britain on medical grounds (ironically following an accidental injury) in September 1944. In March 1945, he was appointed to command the Special Air Service Troops, a brigade containing Special Air Service units, and organised Operation Amherst. He held this appointment until the brigade disbanded in October 1945.

After the war, he attended the Army's Staff College, Camberley. After passing the course, he was appointed to a staff post as lieutenant-colonel in the Allied Military Government in Trieste. He was then selected in 1950 to command the Malayan Scouts engaged in operations against Communist insurgents in the Malayan Emergency. Although he held the local rank of brigadier, he nevertheless led several patrols and operations in person. However, the Malayan Scouts were not subject to proper selection procedures and never lost an early reputation for poor discipline. Calvert's exertions meant that he was invalided home in 1951.

Dismissal from the Army
On his return to the UK, Calvert reverted to the rank of lieutenant-colonel. In 1951 he was assigned to a minor administrative staff post with the British Army of the Rhine. While there in 1952 he was accused of an act of sexual indecency with German civilian youths, court-martialled, found guilty and dismissed from the British Army.

Later life
After the military Calvert tried several times tried to build a career as an engineer, including a spell making a new start in Australia, but his life in this period was plagued by alcoholism, and he resorted to hand-to-mouth manual itinerant work, and for a while he was a vagrant there. He later returned to England.

He wrote three books about his time in Burma with Wingate and the Chindits: Prisoners of Hope, Fighting Mad: One Man's Guerrilla War, and Chindits: Long Range Penetration. He also contributed to the acclaimed British documentary television series, The World at War. He is interviewed in the fourteenth episode, "It's a Lovely Day Tomorrow – Burma (1942–1944)". He also appeared on film in the 2001 documentary series Gladiators of World War II episode 11, entitled "The Chindits".  Subsequently, he was appointed research fellow at the University of Manchester in 1971 to write "The Pattern of Guerrilla Warfare", which was never finished.

With little money in his final years, he was compelled to sell his military medals and decorations in 1997.

Death
Calvert died in his 85th year on 26 November 1998 in Richmond-upon-Thames. Up until his death he was a supporter of The Chindits Old Comrades Association and other charities for the support of ex-servicemen. His body was cremated at the Chilterns Crematorium in Amersham, in the county of Buckinghamshire.

Honours and awards
 Distinguished Service Order 5 August 1943, 18 May 1944
 Silver Star (United States) 19 September 1944
 King Haakon VII's Cross of Liberty (Norway) 19 March 1948
 Commander of the Order of Leopold II with Palm (Belgium)
 Croix de Guerre 1940 with Palm (Belgium) 14 May 1948

References

Citations

Sources
 
 
 Calvert, Michael (1974) Chindits: Long Range Penetration New York: Ballantine Books
 Calvert, Michael (1973) Slim New York: Ballantine Books

External links

Royal Engineers Museum Biography of Mike Calvert
Biography at smallwars.com
Times obituary
Independent obituary
British Army Officers 1939–1945
Imperial War Museum Interview
Generals of World War II

1913 births
1998 deaths
People from Rohtak
Alumni of St John's College, Cambridge
Graduates of the Royal Military Academy, Woolwich
Academics of the Victoria University of Manchester
Royal Engineers officers
British Army brigadiers of World War II
People educated at Bradfield College
Special Air Service officers
British Army personnel of the Malayan Emergency
Companions of the Distinguished Service Order
Recipients of the Silver Star
Recipients of the King Haakon VII Freedom Cross
Commanders of the Order of Leopold II
Recipients of the Croix de guerre (Belgium)
British Army officers
Graduates of the Staff College, Camberley
Military personnel of British India